is a Japanese racing driver for Toyota Gazoo Racing. He currently competes in the GT500 class of the Super GT Series for TGR Team au TOM's, where he is the 2021 series champion. He also competes in the Super Formula Championship for P.mu Cerumo/INGING.

Career

Early career
Tsuboi began his single-seater racing career in 2012 and drove for two years in Formula Challenge Japan. He finished seventh in the standings in 2012, and fifth in 2013, with two race victories.

Following the closure of Formula Challenge Japan, Tsuboi raced in the 2014 JAF Formula 4 regional championship series, finishing second in the FC class championship. That same year, he officially joined the Toyota Young Driver Program (TDP).

In 2015, he made his debut in the inaugural FIA F4 Japanese Championship with the TOM'S Spirit team. He won seven races, and won the championship by just three points ahead of Tadasuke Makino.

Formula 3 
In 2016, he entered the Japanese Formula 3 Championship with TOM'S. Despite not winning a race, he finished third in the championship with 15 podiums in 17 races. In 2017, he won his first race, and won eight of the last ten races to finish second in the championship. And in 2018, he won the title in his third season. Tsuboi set a Japanese F3 record with 17 victories in 19 races, finishing second in the other two races that he did not win.

Tsuboi made three starts in the Macau Grand Prix FIA Formula 3 World Cup between 2016 and 2018. He finished 16th in 2016, and 14th in 2017. In the 2018 race, he and German racing driver Sophia Flörsch were involved in a serious accident. Tsuboi escaped serious injury after Flörsch's car became airborne from contact with Jehan Daruvala.

Super GT 
Tsuboi drove in the GT300 class of the Japanese Super GT Series from 2017 to 2018. He made his debut for JMS P.mu LM Corsa, driving a Lexus RC F GT3. He finished third in the 2017 GT300 standings, winning the Fuji 500 km and the overseas race at Chang International Circuit. In 2018, he drove for Tsuchiya Engineering in their Toyota 86 MC, and finished seventh in the championship with two podiums. He made a one-off GT500 debut for Lexus Team SARD in the 2018 Fuji 500 km, finishing second in his first race aboard the Lexus LC 500.

In 2019, Tsuboi secured his full-time GT500 debut with Lexus Team WedsSport Bandoh. Tsuboi and Yuji Kunimoto finished eleventh in the championship, scoring a third place podium finish at Chang International Circuit.

In 2020, Tsuboi moved to the brand new TGR Team Wako's ROOKIE squad, driving the new Toyota GR Supra GT500. Alongside reigning GT500 champion Kazuya Oshima, Tsuboi scored back to back podium finishes to open the 2020 season. They finished the year seventh in the championship, recording a best finish of second at the fifth round at Fuji Speedway.

Tsuboi changed teams once again in 2021, joining TGR Team au TOM's alongside Yuhi Sekiguchi. Tsuboi finished second in the opening round at Okayama International Circuit, battling Kenta Yamashita for the lead for several laps. Heading into the final round at Fuji Speedway, Tsuboi and Sekiguchi trailed championship leader Naoki Yamamoto by 16 points. Tsuboi went on to win the race, for his first career GT500 class victory. Yamamoto was taken out from a championship-clinching position after GT300 driver Ren Sato crashed into his car with 15 laps remaining, which ultimately secured the championship for Tsuboi and Sekiguchi.

Super Formula 
After his record-setting 2018 Japanese F3 campaign, Tsuboi made the step up to the Super Formula Championship in 2019, joining JMS P.mu/Cerumo-INGING. He recorded a best finish of second in a wet race at Fuji Speedway. Tsuboi finished 12th in the championship, and was third in the Rookie of the Year cup behind Álex Palou.

Tsuboi improved to third in the championship in 2020. He won his first race in the second round at Okayama, and then went on to win the final race of the season at Fuji. He finished the season with 50 points, just twelve points behind eventual series champion Naoki Yamamoto. However, Tsuboi slumped to 15th in the standings in 2021, only managing to score six points with a best finish of seventh at Suzuka.

Racing record

Career summary

‡ Team standings.

Complete Super GT results
(key) (Races in bold indicate pole position) (Races in italics indicate fastest lap)

‡ Half points awarded as less than 75% of race distance was completed.

Complete Super Formula results
(key) (Races in bold indicate pole position) (Races in italics indicate fastest lap)

References

1995 births
Living people
Japanese racing drivers
Japanese Formula 3 Championship drivers
Super Formula drivers
Formula Challenge Japan drivers
Super GT drivers
Sportspeople from Saitama Prefecture
TOM'S drivers
Toyota Gazoo Racing drivers
People from Kawagoe, Saitama
Japanese F4 Championship drivers